Stanapatta (Stanmasuka) was a loose wrap cloth for the upper body. It was a chest band used in ancient India. It was a simple upper garment of the females during the ancient time similar to the mamillare or strophium used by the Roman women. Stanapatta was a part of Poshak (the women's attire). Kālidāsa mentions kurpasika, another form of breastband that is synonymized with uttarasanga and stanapatta by him. Innerwears for lower parts were called nivi or nivi bandha. The Skandamata sculpture of Malhar depicts the use of stanapatta and kanchuki in ancient times.

Style 
The garment was mainly used by married women to cover the nipples or breasts completely. It was also decorated with embellishments and worn with many successor clothes of uttariya, for instance, Sari. Stanapatta changed with the time; few evolved forms are choli or blouse.

See also 
 Uttariya
 Antariya
 Adivasah

References 

Hindu religious clothing
Buddhist religious clothing
Indian clothing
History of India
Women's clothing